All-Star Baseball '97 featuring Frank Thomas, sometimes mislabeled as All Star Baseball '98, is a video game developed by Iguana and published by Acclaim for the PlayStation and Sega Saturn in 1997. It is both the successor to Frank Thomas Big Hurt Baseball and the first game in the All-Star Baseball series.

Reception

Electronic Gaming Monthlys Kraig Kujawa said that the PlayStation version "still plays the same [as Frank Thomas Big Hurt Baseball]. And that's not a good thing. All-Star Baseball reeks of mediocrity. Not one, single facet of the game stands out." Next Generation similarly commented: "All-Star Baseball '97 doesn't excel in any one area. Instead, it is a decent looking game with average gameplay, so-so sound, and not much else to separate it from the pack." GamePros The Rookie was more vehement: "The players are flat and 2D, while occasionally bad camera angles really drag down the action. The control is atrocious because the players react to the ball too late, and you can't manually switch to the player close to the ball." While the Saturn version was largely ignored by reviewers, The Rookie found it more enjoyable than the PlayStation version, citing better control, though he still advised gamers to hold out for World Series Baseball '98 instead. He scored it higher than the PlayStation version in control and fun factor, and equal in graphics and sound.

Notes

References

External links
 

1997 video games
Acclaim Entertainment games
All-Star Baseball video games
Cultural depictions of American men
Cultural depictions of baseball players
North America-exclusive video games
PlayStation (console) games
Sega Saturn games
Video games based on real people
Video games developed in the United States